The following is the discography of Tokyo Police Club. They have regularly released music since their formation in 2005. In addition to their five studio albums, they have put out a number of other original releases as well as reissues, demo albums, and live albums.

Albums

Studio albums

Compilation albums

Cover albums 
 Ten Songs, Ten Years, Ten Days (Dine Alone, 2011)

Live albums 
 Live From Soho EP (Paper Bag, 2007)
 Eight Songs Live (Dine Alone, 2018)

Remix albums 
 Tokyo Police Club Remixes (Memphis, 2007) (A Lesson in Crime remixes)
 Elephant Shell Remixes (Saddle Creek, 2008)

Demo albums 
 Tokyo Police Club (self-released, 2005) (A Lesson in Crime/Smith EP demos)
 Church Demos (self-released, 2020) (TPC demos)

Reissues 
 A Lesson in Crime 10th Anniversary Edition (Paper Bag, 2016)
 Champ 10th Anniversary Edition (Mom + Pop, 2021)

EPs

Singles

As lead artist

As featured artist

Guest appearances

Solo releases 
In November 2008, Tokyo Police Club keyboardist Graham Wright released a solo EP called The Lakes of Alberta online only, available as a free download.  He has also participated in a project called "Novels" with musicians Luke Lalonde (of Born Ruffians), Will Currie (of Will Currie & The Country French), Dean Marino (of Papermaps), and Jay Sadlowski (of Jay Sad) in which these musicians wrote and recorded an entire EP in 24 hours. The CDs were not released in stores, nor on the internet, but were given out to random people or placed in random places. His debut solo album, Shirts vs Skins, was released on June 27, 2010. Greg Alsop has posted comedy sketch videos online, Drumsters and Novelty T-shirt College as well as a song titled ' Losing Our Heads' in 2013 for the Versus Valerie Season One soundtrack.

In June 2015, lead singer Dave Monks released his first solo EP on iTunes, Spotify and Google Play called "All Signs Point to Yes", with two singles having been released prior to the release of the album. The album "On a Wave" followed in 2019. As of 2018 Dave Monks is also a member of the Canadian supergroup Anyway Gang, releasing its self titled album in November 2019. On June 24 2020, Monks released a new EP titled On a Wave Goes Wild.

Notes

References 

Discographies of Canadian artists
Tokyo Police Club albums
Rock music discographies